Kentropyx lagartija, the Tucuman whiptail, is a species of teiid lizard endemic to Argentina.

References

lagartija
Reptiles described in 1962
Taxa named by José María Alfonso Félix Gallardo